John M. Alexander Jr. (born October 1, 1949) is an American politician who served in the North Carolina Senate from 2015 through Jan. 1, 2021. He represented the 15th district from 2015 until 2019, and the 18th district from 2019 through Jan. 1, 2021.

Alexander announced on September 12, 2019 that he would not seek re-election in the 2020 elections.

References

External links

|-

1949 births
Living people
Republican Party North Carolina state senators
Politicians from Raleigh, North Carolina